Massa e Cozzile is a comune (municipality) in the Province of Pistoia in the Italian region Tuscany, located about  northwest of Florence and about  west of Pistoia, in the central part of the Valdinievole. It was the birthplace of composer Bernardo Pasquini.

Massa e Cozzile borders the following municipalities: Buggiano, Marliana, Montecatini-Terme, Pescia.

Twin towns
 Judenburg, Austria

References

External links

 Official website

Cities and towns in Tuscany